Golestanak (also Romanized as Golestānak; also known as Gulistān) is a village in Mohammadabad Rural District, in the Central District of Karaj County, Alborz Province, Iran. As of the 2006 census, its population was 1,468, with there being 371 families.

References 

Populated places in Karaj County